Oxychilus cellarius, common name cellar glass-snail, is a species of small air-breathing land snail, a terrestrial pulmonate gastropod mollusk in the family Oxychilidae, the glass snails.

Description
The shell has 5.5-6 regularly increasing whorls. The last whorl is not inflated and narrower than in Oxychilus draparnaudi. The shell is nearly smooth and shiny and only very faintly striated. The umbilicus is moderately deep and open.

The width of the shell is 7–11 mm (14 mm maximum). The height of the shell is 4.5–6 mm.

The animal is usually pale bluish grey. Genitalia: Penis cylindrical without constrictions (in contrast to Oxychilus draparnaudi), rows of papillae of penis continuous without interruption (interrupted at the constriction in Oxychilus draparnaudi).

Distribution
This species occurs in countries and islands including:
 Czech Republic
 Poland
 Slovakia
 Great Britain
 Ireland
 New Zealand (e.g. Dunedin).

Habitat
Oxychilus cellarius occurs in a number of habitats, like in forests and in habitats modified by humans, such as gardens and green houses.

References

 Spencer, H.G., Marshall, B.A. & Willan, R.C. (2009). Checklist of New Zealand living Mollusca. pp 196–219 in Gordon, D.P. (ed.) New Zealand inventory of biodiversity. Volume one. Kingdom Animalia: Radiata, Lophotrochozoa, Deuterostomia. Canterbury University Press, Christchurch.

External links
 

cellarius
Gastropods described in 1774
Taxa named by Otto Friedrich Müller